Arturo Santana Alfaro (born 28 June 1971) is a Mexican politician from the Party of the Democratic Revolution. He is a deputy representing the 18th federal district of Mexico City in the LXIII Legislature of the Mexican Congress.

Life
Santana obtained his law degree from the UNAM in 1994, but he began working in public service the year before, in the Federal Public Ministry, assigned to the Fourth Court of the State of Mexico. In 1996, he left that post for a brief stint as an advisor to the deputy attorney for General Coordination and Development in the Office of the Attorney General of Mexico (PGR); in 1998, he was a private secretary for the PGR's director of Specialized Public Ministry "B".

In 2000, Santana took on his first legislative position, coordinating advisors to the local deputies in the II Legislature of the Legislative Assembly of the Federal District (ALDF). He then went on to positions in Mexico City's government, including territorial director of Santa Catarina (2003–05) and planning director in Iztapalapa (2005).

2006 saw Santana win an election to the first time, to the ALDF's IV Legislature. He served as the Vice President of the Local Public Administration Commission, a secretary of the Commission for Administration and Prosecution of Justice, as well as a member of two other commissions: Political-Electoral Matters and Public Security.

After that term ended, Santana headed for San Lázaro as a deputy in the LXI Legislature. He presided over the Citizen Participation Commission and served on other commissions, primarily related with accounting, proper use of government electoral resources, and public security. He also served as an alternate representative of the PRD's legislators to the General Council of the Federal Electoral Institute.

In 2012, Santana returned to the ALDF in its VI Legislature. He presided over the Jurisdictional Commission and served on seven others.

Three years later, Santana yet again returned to the federal Chamber of Deputies for the LXIII Legislature. He sits on three commissions: Justice, Transportation, and Drinking Water and Sanitation. In October 2015, Santana presented a proposal on behalf of other PRD deputies to raise the minimum daily wage from 70 pesos to 95.

Personal
In 2013, Santana accused his wife, Teresa Serratos Alvarado with breach of trust when she stole more than 150,000 pesos, which was never proved.

References

1971 births
Living people
Politicians from Mexico City
Members of the Chamber of Deputies (Mexico) for Mexico City
Party of the Democratic Revolution politicians
National Autonomous University of Mexico alumni
21st-century Mexican politicians
Deputies of the LXIII Legislature of Mexico